A Helion meteoroid is a meteoroid that arrives from the approximate direction of the Sun. They are thought to originate as debris from sun-grazing comets.

References
"Exploding Lunar Eclipse", an article about an attempt to observe Helion meteoroids, Science@NASA, August 27, 2007.

Meteoroids